The women's 1500 metres event at the 2015 European Athletics Indoor Championships was held on 8 March at 16:10 local time as a straight final.

Medalists

Results

References

2015 European Athletics Indoor Championships
1500 metres at the European Athletics Indoor Championships
2015 in women's athletics